School Master is a 1959 Indian Hindi film, directed and produced by B. R. Panthulu. The film stars Karan Dewan, Shakila, B. Saroja Devi and Radha Kishan in lead roles. The film had a musical score by Vasant Desai. It is a remake of the 1958 Kannada film of the same name.

Plot 
The film revolves around an old school master and his noble attempt to transform the students of his native village.

Cast 
B. R. Panthulu
Karan Dewan
Shakila
B. Saroja Devi
Radha Kishan
Ullahas
David
Jawahar Ravi
Puranik
Vishva Mehra
Raja Gosavi
Sivaji Ganesan

Music 
"O Diladaar Bolo Ik Baar Kyaa Meraa Pyaar  Pasand Hai Tumhen" – Lata Mangeshkar, Talat Mahmood
 "Aaj Suno Hum Geet Vida Ka" -Kavi Pradeep
 "Aao Behan Bhai Aaj Ghadi Aayi" – Lalita, Indu, Sarla
 "Aaj Andhere Mein Hain Hum Insaan" – Mahendra Kapoor
 "Taar Taar Baj Raha Dil Ke Sur" – Manna Dey, Lata Mangeshkar
 "Hello Hello O Meri Chhumak Chhallo" – Geeta Dutt, Mohammed Rafi
 "Ek Do Teen Gin Bhai Gin" – Aarti Mukherjee
 "Ae Hawaon Ae Dishaon Batao" – Geeta Dutt, Lata Mangeshkar
 "Bolo To Bolo To" – Lata Mangeshkar

References

External links 
 
 

1959 films
1950s Hindi-language films
Films scored by Vasant Desai
Films directed by B. R. Panthulu
Hindi remakes of Kannada films